The 1976 Hazfi Cup was the first staging of Iran's football knockout competition.

Quarterfinals

Semifinals

Final

References
Iran (Cup) 1976 RSSSF

Hazfi Cup seasons
Iran
Cup